The London Division, Royal Artillery, was an administrative grouping of garrison units of the Royal Artillery and Artillery Volunteers within the British Army's Home and Woolwich Districts from 1882 to 1889.

Organisation
Under General Order 72 of 4 April 1882 the Royal Artillery (RA) broke up its existing administrative brigades of garrison artillery (7th–11th Brigades, RA) and assigned the individual batteries to 11 new territorial divisions. These divisions were purely administrative and recruiting organisations, not field formations. Most were formed within the existing military districts into which the United Kingdom was divided, and for the first time associated the auxiliary forces with the regulars. The Regular Army batteries were grouped into one brigade, usually of nine sequentially-numbered batteries and a depot battery. For these units the divisions represented recruiting districts – batteries could be serving anywhere in the British Empire and their only connection to brigade headquarters (HQ) was for the supply of drafts and recruits. The artillery volunteers, which had previously consisted of numerous independent Artillery Volunteer Corps (AVC) of various sizes, sometimes grouped into administrative brigades, had been consolidated into larger AVCs in 1881, which were now affiliated to the appropriate territorial division.

Composition
London Division, RA, listed as fifth in order of precedence, was organised covering Home and Woolwich Districts with the following composition:

 Headquarters (HQ) at Royal Artillery Barracks, Woolwich
 1st Brigade
 HQ at Woolwich
 1st Bty at Portsmouth – formerly 8th Bty, 10 Bde
 2nd Bty at Gosport – formerly 16th Bty, 8th Bde
 3rd Bty at Shoeburyness – formerly 17th Bty, 8th Bde
 4th Bty at Malta – formerly 4th Bty, 10th Bde
 5th Bty at Malta – formerly 5th Bty, 10th Bde
 6th Bty at Malta – formerly 5th Bty, 9th Bde
 7th Bty at Aden – formerly 13th Bty, 9th Bde
 8th Bty at Delhi – formerly 7th Bty, 11th Bde
 9th Bty – new Bty formed 1885
 10th Bty – new Bty formed 1887
 Depot Bty at Woolwich – formerly Depot Bty, 1st Bde
 2nd Kent Artillery Volunteers at Plumstead
 3rd Kent Artillery Volunteers (Royal Arsenal) at Woolwich
 2nd Middlesex Artillery Volunteers at Custom House, London
 3rd Middlesex Artillery Volunteers at Regent Street, London
 1st (City of London) London Artillery Volunteers at City of London

Disbandment
In 1889 the garrison artillery was reorganised again into three large divisions of garrison artillery (Eastern, Southern and Western) and one of mountain artillery. The volunteer units formerly in London Division were reassigned to the Eastern Division while the regular batteries were distributed across all four divisions and completely renumbered.

See also
 Royal Garrison Artillery
 List of Royal Artillery Divisions 1882–1902
 Eastern Division, Royal Artillery
 Southern Division, Royal Artillery
 Western Division, Royal Artillery
 Mountain Division, Royal Artillery

Footnotes

Notes

References
 J.B.M. Frederick, Lineage Book of British Land Forces 1660–1978, Vol II, Wakefield: Microform Academic, 1984, ISBN 1-85117-009-X.
 Lt-Gen H.G. Hart, The New Annual Army List, Militia List, Yeomanry Cavalry List and Indian Civil Service List for 1884, London: John Murray, 1883.
 Lt-Gen H.G. Hart, The New Annual Army List, Militia List, Yeomanry Cavalry List and Indian Civil Service List for 1890, London: John Murray, 1889.
 Lt-Col M.E.S. Lawes, Battery Records of the Royal Artillery, 1859–1877, Woolwich: Royal Artillery Institution, 1970.
 Norman Litchfield & Ray Westlake, The Volunteer Artillery 1859–1908 (Their Lineage, Uniforms and Badges), Nottingham: Sherwood Press, 1982, ISBN 0-9508205-0-4.
 Col K. W. Maurice-Jones, The History of Coast Artillery in the British Army, London: Royal Artillery Institution, 1959/Uckfield: Naval & Military Press, 2005, ISBN 978-1-845740-31-3.
 War Office, Monthly Army List, London: HM Stationery Office, 1882–89.

Royal Artillery divisions
Military units and formations in London
Military units and formations established in 1882
Military units and formations disestablished in 1889